Zartonk, is a village in the Armavir Province of Armenia. Almost 42% (around 980 individuals) of the population are from the Yazidi minority.

See also 
Armavir Province

References 

World Gazeteer: Armenia – World-Gazetteer.com

Populated places in Armavir Province
Yazidi villages
Yazidi populated places in Armenia